Samay Bada Balwan is a 1969 Hindi social moral drama film produced and directed by Sohrab Modi.
Modi had sold his studio a year earlier but tried to revive the Minerva Movietone banner by producing this film.
The music director was Usha Khanna with lyrics written by D. N. Madhok. This was the only film in which Modi used Usha Khanna as a music composer.  Mehtab acted together again with Modi in Samay Bada Balwan in a supporting role as Modi's wife. This was to be the last acting role of her career. The film starred Sohrab Modi, Mehtab, Aruna Irani, Sailesh Kumar, Shahida, David, and Helen.

The film was a moralistic drama about valuing relationships irrespective of the hardships people face. The story follows the reversal of fortunes Uttam (Sohrab Modi) faces, first the failure in his business, and then the improvement again, showcasing people's response to him along the way.

Plot
Uttam (Sohrab Modi) is a rich cotton merchant who lives in a mansion with his wife Damyanti (Mehtab). Uttam's younger brother Ram (Sailesh Kumar), who is engaged to Seth Dhanichand’s (Wasti) elder daughter Gauri (Shahida), also lives with them. Damyanti's opportunistic brother, Dwarkadas (K. N. Singh) is in partnership with Uttam. Uttam loses his merchandise in a fire and becomes financially destitute, though he continues to live in the big mansion. Ram's engagement is called off by Dhanichand. Dwarkadas breaks off his partnership with Uttam and gets his son engaged to Dhanichand's younger daughter. Uttam attends the engagement ceremony, but is humiliated and accused of stealing money. He is also beaten up on his way home by some thugs sent by Dwarkadas. The film then follows Uttam's slow rise back again financially, while Dhanichand and Dwarkadas now face poverty.

Cast
 Sohrab Modi as Uttam
 Mehtab as Damyanti, Uttam's wife
 Sailesh Kumar as Ram, Uttam's brother
 K. N. Singh as Dwarkadas, Damyanti's brother
 Shahida as Gauri
 Wasti as Seth Dhanichand
 Aruna Irani
 Helen
 David
 Monto

Soundtrack
The playback singers were Mohammed Rafi, Asha Bhosle, Krishna Kalle, Usha Khanna, Hemlata with lyrics by D. N. Madhok and soundtrack composed by Usha Khanna. The notable songs were "Teri Tasveer Se Aankhen Meri Kyun Hatati Nahin" sung by Mohammed Rafi and Asha Bhosle, and "Bhoole Afsane Phir Se Yaad Aaye" sung by Mohammed Rafi.

Song list

References

External links

1969 films
1960s Hindi-language films
1969 drama films
Indian drama films
Films directed by Sohrab Modi
Films scored by Usha Khanna
Hindi-language drama films